The University of Maryland Arboretum and Botanical Garden is located on the grounds of the University of Maryland - College Park. The Arboretum and Botanical Garden is free to visit and is used as an outdoor classroom for a variety of courses at the University. There is an established Central Campus Tree Walking Tour around McKeldin Mall.

References

Botanical gardens in Maryland
University of Maryland, College Park
Parks in Prince George's County, Maryland